The  Baloch people in Punjab(), is a community of Baloch people who have settled in the Punjab province of Pakistan. A significant number of Baloch tribes have over time settled in the Punjab. The Baloch of southern Punjab, including Dera Ghazi Khan and Rajanpur, which adjoin Balochistan, speak Saraiki and Balochi.

History
According to Dr. Akhtar Baloch, Professor at University of Karachi, the Baloch migrated from Balochistan during the Little Ice Age and settled in Sindh and Punjab. According to Professor Baloch, the climate of Balochistan was very cold during this epoch and the region was inhabitable during the winter so the Baloch people migrated in waves and settled in Sindh and Punjab. Baloch people form majority in Dera Ghazi Khan or Rajanpur districts and found significant numbers in Layyah, Muzaffargarh, Rahim Yar Khan districts, and Multan district.

Notable people
 
 

Sardar Fateh Buzdar, politician
Usman Buzdar, politician
Sardar Nasrullah Khan Dreshak
Sardar Ali Raza Khan Dreshak
Sardar Hasnain Bahadar Dreshak
Asif Saeed Khosa, ex Chief Justice of Pakistan
Latif Khosa
Zulfiqar Ali Khosa
Dost Muhammad Khosa
Shahnaz Laghari
Bilal Lashari
Kamran Lashari
Awais Leghari
Farooq Leghari
Jamal Leghari
Balakh Sher Mazari
Dost Muhammad Mazari
Muniba Mazari
Sardar Riaz Mehmood Khan Mazari
Shaukat Hussein Mazari
Shireen Mazari

See also
Mirani dynasty

Khans of Sahiwal

References

Social groups of Punjab, Pakistan
Punjabi tribes
Baloch diaspora
Saraiki tribes